The Best Major League Baseball Player ESPY Award, known alternatively as the Best Baseball Player ESPY Award, has been presented annually since 1993 to the Major League Baseball (MLB) player adjudged to be the best in a given calendar year, typically most significantly in the MLB season in progress during the holding of the ESPY Awards ceremony.

Between 1993 and 2004, the award voting panel comprised variously fans; sportswriters and broadcasters, sports executives, and retired sportspersons, termed collectively experts; and retired sportspersons, but balloting thereafter has been exclusively by fans over the Internet from amongst choices selected by the ESPN Select Nominating Committee. The award wasn't awarded in 2020 due to the COVID-19 pandemic.

List of winners
Through the 2001 iteration of the ESPY Awards, ceremonies were conducted in February of each year to honor achievements over the previous calendar year; awards presented thereafter are conferred in July and reflect performance from the June previous.

 Player was a member of the winning team in the World Series.   Player was a member of the losing team in the World Series. * Major League Baseball MVP† World Series MVP

See also
Players Choice Awards Player of the Year (in MLB; for all positions) (there are also Outstanding Player and Outstanding Pitcher awards in each league)
Baseball America Major League Player of the Year (in MLB; for all positions)
The Sporting News Player of the Year Award (in MLB; for all positions) (Sporting News also has a Pitcher of the Year award for each league)
The Sporting News Most Valuable Player Award (in each league) (discontinued in 1946)
Baseball Digest Player of the Year (in MLB; for position players) (from 1969 to 1993, included all positions; in 1994, a separate Pitcher of the Year award was added)
MLB GIBBY / This Year in Baseball Awards (in MLB; Hitter of the Year, Starting Pitcher of the Year, Closer of the Year, Setup Man of the Year)
Most Valuable Player Award (in each league; for all positions) (MLB also has the Cy Young Award for a pitcher in each league)
Baseball awards#U.S. major leagues: Awards by organizations other than MLB
List of MLB awards

Notes

References

ESPY Awards
Major League Baseball trophies and awards
Baseball most valuable player awards
Most valuable player awards
Awards established in 1993